The Brazil women's national beach handball team is the national team of Brazil. It is governed by the Confederação Brasileira de Handebol and takes part in international beach handball competitions.

Results

World Championships

World Games

* invitational sport

World Beach Games

References

External links
Official website
IHF profile

Beach handball
Women's national beach handball teams